List of important battles fought in Medieval India.

Battles
India, medi